SBM Bank India is a subsidiary of the State Bank of Mauritius. It was the first bank to receive a banking license from the India's banking regulator Reserve Bank of India (RBI) to establish a universal banking business in the country as a wholly owned subsidiary. It was incorporated on 1 December 2018 as a private sector bank headquartered in Mumbai. It also operates from New Delhi, Bengaluru, Chennai, Hyderabad, Ahmedabad, and in the rural centers of Ramachandrapuram and Palghar.

History 

SBM Bank (India) Ltd. is a step-down subsidiary of SBM Holdings Ltd, a listed entity in the Mauritius Stock exchange, promoted by the Government of Mauritius, brought its rich experience to India by setting up the Indian Operations in 1994.

Products and services 
SBM Bank (India) Ltd. focuses on retail banking products under the brand "SBM Private Wealth" and customized wholesale banking products.

Tie-ups and Partnerships 

 SBM Bank taps partnerships to grow India operations.
 SBM Bank India partners with Lendingkart to offer overdraft facility for working capital to MSMEs. SBM Bank offers a customised overdraft facility to over 1,00,000 customers of Lendingkart, largely MSMEs.
 SBM Bank India to empower for MSME exporters through collaboration with Drip Capital.
 SBM Bank India re-imagines credit card experience in partnership with OneCard. SBM Bank India did the Collaboration with OneCard to extend mobile-based credit cards. With in-app on-boarding, the virtual card can be activated & used instantly, while the physical card is delivered to the customer in as less as 3–5 days time.
 SBM Bank India tied up with CredAvenue for NBFCs and fintec.
 SBM Bank India taps 30 fintechs to grow deposit operations.
 Vested Finance and SBM Bank come together to offer forex transfers.
 Paisabazaar introduces its neo-lending strategy, launches Step Up Credit Card with SBM Bank India.
 Niyo and SBM Bank India come together to offer Niyo Global experience for passport holders.
 Niyo with SBM Bank India and VISA now offers a digital savings account with travel-friendly product Niyo Global. Along with zero-forex mark-up, customers can now earn an attractive interest p.a. on the savings account.
 U GRO Capital and SBM Bank India together launch ‘GRO Smart Business’ credit cards targeted to MSMEs.
 SBM Bank India along with Mastercard facilitate cross border transactions, remittances.
 LoanTap in association with SBM Bank and Rupay, launches limitless prepaid cards.
 SBM EnKash RuPay Business Card through RuPay network will offer a host of unique amenities designed for SMEs, MSMEs, and start-ups.
 SBM Bank India taps Vakrangee for Banking Business Correspondent (BC) service.
 Finin collaborates with SBM Bank India.
 Arya announces its collaboration with SBM Bank India to tap the mid-market segment, including mid-corporates and higher-end SMEs.
 Vakrangee partners with SBM Bank India to take Smart Banking to Indian hinterlands.
 Bharti AXA Life tied up with SBM Bank India for insurance distribution.
 SBM Bank India and PayNearby come together to democratize financial investments.

References

Private sector banks in India
Banks of India
Indian brands
Banking in India
Financial services companies based in Mumbai